Ton Pansier (1 February 1947 – 12 May 2021) was a Dutch footballer who played as a defender.

Club career
He made his senior debut in the Tweede Divisie for hometown club Xerxes on 2 May 1965 against 't Gooi and played there alongside club legends Nol Heijerman, Rob Jacobs, Willem van Hanegem and Eddy Treijtel. His playing opportunities however were limited since he mostly featured as a back-up for Yugoslav playmaker Lazar Radović.

He left Xerxes in 1968 for SVV and clinched promotion to the Eredivisie in 1969 with them.

In 1971 he joined Neptunus.

International career
He earned five caps for the Netherlands U19 team in 1965 and played at the 1965 UEFA European Under-18 Championship.

References

External links
 Eredivisie stats - Ererat

1947 births
2021 deaths
Footballers from Rotterdam
Association football midfielders
Dutch footballers
Netherlands youth international footballers
XerxesDZB players
SV SVV players
Eredivisie players
Eerste Divisie players